Delyne Esther Leiva Morlas (born 27 March 1998) is a Paraguayan handball player for Club Cerro Porteño and the Paraguay national team.

She was selected to represent Paraguay at the 2017 World Women's Handball Championship.

References

1998 births
Living people
Paraguayan female handball players
20th-century Paraguayan women
21st-century Paraguayan women
South American Games medalists in handball
South American Games silver medalists for Paraguay
Competitors at the 2022 South American Games